Yevhen Stepanovych Pavlov, Yevgeny Stepanovich Pavlov (born 12 March 1991) is a Ukrainian professional footballer who plays as a striker for Serbian club Radnički Niš.

Club career
Pavlov came through the youth system of Volyn Lutsk. He scored on his first team debut after coming on as a second-half substitute in a 2–1 home win over Obolon Kyiv on 20 March 2007, aged 16. Pavlov had his highest goalscoring tally in the 2009–10 season, netting 11 goals in 19 league appearances, as the club won promotion to the Ukrainian Premier League. He spent three more seasons at the club, before being released in the summer of 2013.

After being without a club for several months, Pavlov had a trial with Serbian champions Partizan in December 2013. He scored two goals for their affiliated side Teleoptik in a test match, but failed to sign a contract. He eventually signed with Sevastopol in March 2014, making three league appearances until the end of the 2013–14 season.

After the annexation of Sevastopol, Crimea to Russia took Russian citizenship as Yevgeny Pavlov. In August 2014, Pavlov joined Russian club Sokol Saratov.

In January 2015, Pavlov returned to Serbia by signing a permanent contract for SuperLiga club Mladost Lučani. He made 10 league appearances and scored two goals until the end of the 2014–15 season.

On 18 August 2015 Pavlov signed a three-year deal with Hungarian club Vasas.

On 6 September 2021, he signed with Radnički Niš in Serbia.

International career
Pavlov represented his country at all youth international levels from Under-16 to Under-21.

Statistics

References

External links

 FPL profile
 
 

Ukrainian footballers
Association football forwards
Expatriate footballers in Russia
Expatriate footballers in Serbia
Expatriate footballers in Hungary
Expatriate footballers in Cyprus
Expatriate footballers in Kazakhstan
FC Sevastopol players
FC Sokol Saratov players
FC Volyn Lutsk players
FK Mladost Lučani players
Vasas SC players
FK Radnik Surdulica players
FK Radnički Niš players
1991 births
Living people
Sportspeople from Sevastopol
Serbian SuperLiga players
Ukraine under-21 international footballers
Ukraine youth international footballers
Ukrainian expatriate footballers
Ukrainian expatriate sportspeople in Russia
Ukrainian expatriate sportspeople in Serbia
Ukrainian expatriate sportspeople in Hungary
Ukrainian expatriate sportspeople in Cyprus
Ukrainian expatriate sportspeople in Kazakhstan
Ukrainian Premier League players
Ukrainian First League players
Naturalised citizens of Russia
Nemzeti Bajnokság I players